KELM or variation, may refer to:

 the ICAO code for Elmira/Corning Regional Airport, in Chemung County, New York, United States
 KELM-LP, a defunct low-power television station (channel 43) formerly licensed to Reno, Nevada, United States
 Kelmė, also spelt Kelm, a Lithuanian town
 Kelm, a surname

See also

 
 
 
 Chelm (disambiguation)
 Kelme (disambiguation)